Hypoptopoma sternoptychum is a species of catfish of the family Loricariidae.

This catfish reaches a maximum length of  SL. It is demersal, being found in fresh water in the tropics.
 
Hypoptopoma sternoptychum is native to South America, occurring in tributaries from the upper and central Amazon River in Ecuador, Peru and Bolivia.

Threats

Hypoptopoma sternoptychum is harmless to humans.

References

Schaefer, S.A., 1996. Nannoptopoma, a new genus of loricariid catfishes (Siluriformes: Loricariidae) from the Amazon and Orinoco river basins. Copeia 1996(4):913-926.

Hypoptopomatini
Taxa named by Scott Allen Schaefer
Fish described in 1996